Tom or Thomas Kirby may refer to:

 Tom Kirby (boxer) (1904–1967), American boxer
 Tom Kirby (darts player) (1947–2008), Irish darts player
 Tom Kirby (politician), American politician
 Thomas Ellis Kirby (1846–1924), auctioneer

See also
Thomas Kirkby (disambiguation)